This is a list of Canadian organizations with royal patronage. The practice of members of the Canadian Royal Family giving their patronage to Canadian organizations stems from that which started in the United Kingdom in pre-industrial times, when all development of the sciences and arts were under the direct control of the monarch and exercised by the foundation of colleges that today form the basis of modern universities. Today, royal patronage is a ceremonial function wherein the royal person will either volunteer their time for service or make charitable donations, in order to help bring recognition to the group's achievements and to the contributions of different sectors of public life.

Any organization may apply for royal patronage, via the Office of the Governor General; however, to receive the honour, an organization must prove to be long lasting and have aims and objectives that will earn the approval of the person from whom patronage is requested. Also, patronage is typically granted to athletic, artistic, cultural, or charitable organizations; rarely to corporate or for-profit companies. Some charities and volunteer organizations have been founded as gifts to, or in honour of, some of Canada's monarchs or members of the Royal Family, such as the Victorian Order of Nurses (a gift to Queen Victoria for her Diamond Jubilee in 1897), the Canadian Cancer Fund (set up in honour of King George V's Silver Jubilee in 1935), and the Queen Elizabeth II Fund to Aid in Research on the Diseases of Children.

King Charles III
King Charles III is the patron of the following organizations:

 Canadian Warplane Heritage Museum
 Royal Hamilton Yacht Club
 Canadian Businesses for Social Responsibility
 Regina Symphony Orchestra
 Willowbank School of Restoration Arts
 The Royal Conservatory of Music

Prince Andrew, Duke of York
Prince Andrew was the patron of the following organizations, until returning these patronages to the Queen in 2022:

 Canadian Canoe Museum (2006-2019)
 Canadian International Air Show
 Lakefield College School (as Trustee)
 Maple Bay Yacht Club ( -2019)
 Royal Victoria Yacht Club ( -2019)
 Royal United Services Institute of Alberta
 Friends of Lakefield College School ( -2019)
 Robert Trent Jones Scholarship Foundation

Prince Edward, Duke of Edinburgh
Prince Edward is the patron of the following organizations:
 Globe Theatre (Regina, Saskatchewan)
 The Duke of Edinburgh's Award, Young Canadians Challenge Charter for Business (as Honorary Chairman)

Sophie, Duchess of Edinburgh
The Duchess of Edinburgh is the patron of the following organizations:
 New Haven Trust
 Toronto General Hospital

Anne, Princess Royal
Princess Anne is the patron of the following organizations:

 Canadian Therapeutic Riding Association
 Princess Margaret Cancer Centre
 Emerging Leaders' Dialogue Canada (as President)

Princess Alexandra, The Honourable Lady Ogilvy
Princess Alexandra is the patron of the following organizations:

Civilian
 Friends of the Osborne and Lillian H. Smith Collections

Military

 Royal Canadian Military Institute (as Colonel-in-Chief)

Viceroys
The viceroys are the patrons of the following organizations:

New Brunswick
 Royal New Brunswick Rifle Association
 Royal United Services Institute of New Brunswick (Honorary)

Ontario

Civilian
 Royal Canadian Institute
 Royal Ontario Museum
 Royal Botanical Gardens

Military
 Royal Canadian Military Institute

Former patronages

Queen Elizabeth II

Before her 2022 death, Queen Elizabeth II was the patron of the following organizations:

Civilian

 Canadian Cancer Society
 Canadian Medical Association
 Canadian National Exhibition Association
 Canadian Nurses Association
 Canadian Red Cross Society
 Commonwealth Parliamentary Association
 Federated Women's Institutes of Canada
 Imperial Order of the Daughters of the Empire
 Queen's Plate
 Royal Agricultural Winter Fair of Toronto
 Royal Alberta Museum
 Royal Architectural Institute of Canada
 Royal British Columbia Museum
 Royal Canadian Humane Association
 Royal Canadian Legion
 Royal College of Physicians and Surgeons of Canada
 Royal Manitoba Theatre Centre
 Royal Manitoba Winter Fair
 Royal Nova Scotia International Tattoo
 Royal Saskatchewan Museum
 Royal Winnipeg Ballet
 Save the Children Canada
 St. John Ambulance
 St. John's-Ravenscourt School
 Toronto French School

Military

 Royal Canadian Air Force Benevolent Fund
 Royal Canadian Naval Benevolent Fund
 Navy League of Canada
 Royal Canadian Naval Association
 Royal Canadian Air Force Association

Prince Philip, Duke of Edinburgh

Civilian

Military

Queen Alexandra
Queen Alexandra is the patron of the following organization:
 Queen Alexandra Foundation for Children

See also
 List of Australian organisations with royal patronage
 List of New Zealand organizations with royal patronage
 List of Irish organizations with royal patronage
 List of UK organisations with royal patronage
 List of Canadian organizations with royal prefix
 Colonel-in-Chief: Canadian Forces
 Monarchy of Canada

References

External links
 List of Canadian organizations with Royal patronage - Heritage Canada
 List of civilian organizations with the prefix "Royal" prepared by the Department of Canadian Heritage

 
Monarchy in Canada
Royal patronage